Paulus Shipanga (born 19 May 1980) is a retired Namibian football player. He currently coaches Namibia Premier League outfit Black Africa Football Club. In his playing days he also featured in the Namibian national team.

External links

1980 births
Living people
Namibian men's footballers
Namibia international footballers
Namibian expatriate sportspeople in South Africa
Namibian expatriate sportspeople in Malaysia
Expatriate footballers in Malaysia
Expatriate soccer players in South Africa
Bidvest Wits F.C. players
Sabah F.C. (Malaysia) players
Eleven Arrows F.C. players
Blue Waters F.C. players
Association football forwards
Namibian expatriate footballers
Bay United F.C. players
Namibian football managers